Maria Theresa of Austria (22 August 1684 – 28 September 1696) was a daughter of Leopold I, Holy Roman Emperor and his third wife Eleonore Magdalene of the Palatinate.

She was born at the Hofburg Palace in Vienna, the fourth daughter of Leopold I, Holy Roman Emperor and Eleonore Magdalene of the Palatinate. Maria Theresa died of smallpox at the age of twelve, at the Palais Ebersdorf in Vienna. She is buried in the Imperial Crypt.

Ancestors

References

1684 births
1696 deaths
17th-century House of Habsburg
17th-century Austrian women
Burials at the Imperial Crypt
Burials at St. Stephen's Cathedral, Vienna
Austrian princesses
Nobility from Vienna
Deaths from smallpox
Daughters of emperors
Royalty and nobility who died as children
Children of Leopold I, Holy Roman Emperor
Daughters of kings